Peter Fish may refer to:
 Tilapia, also known as St Peter's fish
 Peter Fish (lawyer)
 Peter Fish (composer)